Simcenter Amesim is a commercial simulation software for the modeling and analysis of multi-domain systems. It is part of systems engineering domain and falls into the mechatronic engineering field.

The software package is a suite of tools used to model, analyze and predict the performance of mechatronics systems. Models are described using nonlinear time-dependent analytical equations that represent the system's hydraulic, pneumatic, thermal, electric or mechanical behavior. Compared to 3D CAE modeling this approach gives the capability to simulate the behavior of systems before detailed CAD geometry is available, hence it is used earlier in the system design cycle or V-Model.

To create a simulation model for a system, a set of libraries is used. These contain pre-defined components for different physical domains. The icons in the system have to be connected and for this purpose each icon has ports, which have several inputs and outputs. Causality is enforced by linking the inputs of one icon to the outputs of another icon (and vice versa).

Simcenter Amesim libraries are written in C language and also support Modelica, which is a non-proprietary, object-oriented, equation based language to model complex physical systems containing, e.g., mechanical, electrical, electronic, hydraulic, thermal, control, electric power or process-oriented subcomponents.  The software runs on Linux and on Windows platforms.

Simcenter Amesim is a part of the Siemens Digital Industries Software Simcenter portfolio. This combines 1D simulation, 3D CAE and physical testing with intelligent reporting and data analytics. This portfolio is intended for development of complex products that include smart systems, through implementing a Predictive Engineering Analytics approach.

History
The Simcenter Amesim software was developed by Imagine S.A., a company which was acquired in June 2007 by LMS International, which itself was acquired in November 2012 by Siemens AG.

The Imagine S.A. company was created in 1987 by Dr Michel Lebrun from the University Claude Bernard in France, to control complex dynamic systems coupling hydraulic servo-actuators with finite-elements mechanical structures. The initial engineering project involved the deck elevation of the sinking Ekofisk North Sea petroleum platforms.

In the early 1990s the association with Pr C. W. Richards, coming from the University of Bath in England, led to the first commercial release of Simcenter Amesim in 1995 which was then dedicated to fluid control systems.

Simcenter Amesim is used by companies in the automotive, aerospace and other advanced manufacturing industries.

Usage
Simcenter Amesim is a multi-domain software that supports modeling a variety of physics domains (hydraulic, pneumatic, mechanic, electrical, thermal, electromechanical). It is based on the Bond graph theory.

Under the Windows platform, Simcenter Amesim works with the free Gcc compiler, which is provided with the software. It also works with the Microsoft Visual C++ compiler and its free Express edition. Since the version 4.3.0 Simcenter Amesim uses the Intel compiler on all platforms.

Platform facilities
Simcenter Amesim features:

Platform Facilities
graphical user interface, interactive help, supercomponents, post-processed variables, experiments management, meta-data, statechart designer
Analysis Tools
table editor, plots, dashboard, 3D animation, replay of results, linear analysis (eigenvalues, modal shapes, transfer functions, root locus), activity index, power and energy computation
Optimization, Robustness, DOE
Design Of Experiments, optimization, Monte-Carlo
Solvers and Numerics
LSODA, DASSL, DASKR, fixed-step solvers, discrete partitioning, parallel processing, Simcenter Amesim/Simcenter Amesim cosimulations
Software Interfaces
generic co-simulation (to be used to co-simulate with any software coupled to Simcenter Amesim), functional mock-up interface (export)
MIL/SIL/HIL and Real-Time
plant/control, various real-time targets
Simulator Scripting
scripting functions to pilot the simulations from Microsoft Excel, MATLAB, Scilab, Python, and support for C and Python development and reverse-engineering script generation from a model
Customization
own customized pre and post-processing tools with python, script caller assistant, editor of parameters group, app designer
Modelica Platform
support of the Modelica modeling language
1D/3D CAE
CAD Import, CFD software co-simulation, FEA import of reduced modal basis with pre-defined frontier nodes, MBS software cosimulation and import/export
Development
Users can develop submodels from different standard submodels (supercomponent) using Component Customization functionality or by programming them in C or in Fortran with the Submodel Editor.

Physical libraries
Physical libraries from which models can be built include control, electrical networks, mechanical, fluid, thermodynamic, IC engine, and aerospace and defense libraries.

Education and research
Simcenter Amesim is used by engineering schools and universities.
It is also the reference framework for various research projects in Europe.

Release history

See also

 Model-based design
 Lumped-element model
 Distributed-element model
 Bond graphs
 Mechatronics
 Control theory
 Real-time computing
 Hardware-in-the-loop simulation
 Systems engineering
 Simulink
 20-sim
 Wolfram SystemModeler

References

Simulation software
Numerical software
Computer-aided engineering
Simulation programming languages
Fortran